Labcorp Drug Development is a contract research organization (CRO) headquartered in Burlington, North Carolina, providing nonclinical, preclinical, clinical and commercialization services to pharmaceutical and biotechnology industries. Formerly called Covance, the company is part of Labcorp, which employs more than 70,000 people worldwide. Labcorp Drug Development claims to provide the world's largest central laboratory network. Labcorp Drug Development has been met by fierce activism from animal rights leaders including Jane Goodall for its animal testing procedures.

History

Pre-Labcorp Drug Development companies (1968–1996)
The origins of Labcorp Drug Development go back to 1968, when Environmental Sciences Corporation – which manufactured equipment related to laboratory animals – opened for business in the basement of a former grocery store in Seattle, Washington. In 1972, it purchased and took the name of Hazleton Laboratories, a contract laboratory that conducted toxicology testing. In 1977, Corning Glass Works purchased a stake in Hazleton. According to material on the Funding Universe website, by 1982, Hazleton had become the largest independent biological testing company and life sciences laboratory in the United States, as well as the largest manufacturer of equipment in the world. The company carried out toxicology tests on animals of drugs, cosmetics, pesticides, and industrial chemicals, and bred rhesus monkeys and beagles for its own labs, as well as for chemical and drug companies, hospitals, universities and government agencies. It offered chemical analysis of new compound products for various industries, tested chemicals for gene mutations, and carried out research with monoclonal antibodies.

In 1989, Corning Glass Works purchased G.H. Besselaar Associates, which conducted clinical trials to help drugs gain approval from the Food and Drug Administration, and Hazleton purchased Microtest Ltd., a molecular toxicology center in York, England. Corning Glass Works then changed its name to Corning, and created Corning Lab Services, which included Besselaar and Hazelton. In 1991 and 1992, Corning Lab Services acquired SciCor and Philadelphia Association of Clinical Trials; in 1993, Hazleton, Besselaar, and SciCor were combined, becoming Corning Pharmaceutical Services, then Corning Life Sciences. On January 9, 1995, Corning Pharmaceutical Services announced the acquisition of National Packaging Systems, Inc., an Allentown, Pennsylvania-based clinical trial packaging company; the company was renamed Corning National Packaging Inc.

Labcorp Drug Development as Covance (1996–2014)
After completing the spin-off of Covance from Corning in 1996, Covance began operations as an independent, publicly traded company on the New York Stock Exchange (NYSE) in January 1997.

By 1998, Covance had net revenues of $731.6 million and a net income of $48.6 million. By 2012, it had annual revenues of over $2 billion and over 11,000 employees in more than 60 countries. In 1998, Covance acquired the Berkeley (California, US) Antibody Company.

In 2000, Covance started a central laboratory in Singapore, building on clinical-development services that they formed in Singapore in 1996.

On February 14, 2001, Covance completed the sale of Covance Pharmaceutical Packaging Services Inc., later renamed Fisher Clinical Services, to Fisher Scientific International for $137.5 million. The net proceeds from the sale, approximately $110 million, were used to repay other Covance debt.

In 2002, Covance acquired Virtual Center Laboratory B.V., which is now known as Local Laboratory Services.

In August 2005, it acquired GFI Clinical Services, an 80-bed clinical pharmacology business, from West Pharmaceutical Services, Inc.

In 2006, Covance announced the acquisition of eight early phase clinical pharmacology sites of Radiant Research, Inc.
and later opened what was then the largest toxicology expansion in Madison, Wisconsin, US.

In May 2006, it acquired Signet Laboratories, Inc., a provider of monoclonal antibodies used in the research of cancer, infectious disease and neurodegenerative disease.

In 2007, Covance opened a Central Lab facility in Shanghai, China.

In 2008, Covance acquired Eli Lilly’s Greenfield, Indiana campus and executed a 10-year service drug development service agreement with Lilly. Also, in 2008, Covance purchased a minority equity stake in Caprion Proteomics, known for proteomic biomarker services.

In 2009, Covance acquired Merck's Seattle-based Gene Expression Laboratory and entered into a five-year, $145 million contract to provide Merck with genomic analysis services.

In 2010, Covance and Sanofi-Aventis created an outsourcing partnership, which, at the time was considered the largest between a contract research organization (CRO) and a pharmaceutical company. Covance also acquired sites from Sanofi-Aventis in Porcheville, France and Alnwick, United Kingdom.

In 2011, Covance acquired the assets of Signet Laboratories, Inc., a provider of monoclonal antibodies used in the research of cancer, infectious disease and neurodegenerative disease.

In 2014, Covance acquired Medaxial, known for its market access consulting.

Labcorp Drug Development as Covance (2014–present)
On November 3, 2014, Laboratory Corporation of America purchased Covance for $6.1 billion.

In 2016, Covance entered a five-year strategic alliance with Global Specimen Solutions and the use of their specimen management product, GlobalCODE, among other software products. In 2017, Global Specimen Solutions, Inc. was listed as a Labcorp subsidiary.

On August 31, 2017, Labcorp acquired global life sciences business, Chiltern, as part of its drug development services with Covance. The Chiltern acquisition included a subsidiary of Endpoint Clinical Inc and their interactive response technology (IRT) systems.

In 2018, Labcorp sold the Covance Food Solutions business to Eurofins for $670 million.

In 2018, Labcorp acquired Sciformix Corporation to add to the Covance service line with additional post-commercialization services such as Safety & Risk Management, Clinical Research & Post-Approval Support, Regulatory Affairs & Regulatory Operations, Real World Evidence & Market Access, and Technology Services.

In 2019, Labcorp and Envigo reached an agreement for Covance to acquire Envigo's nonclinical research services business. Envigo purchased Covance's research products business.

Labcorp Drug Development (2021–present)
In June 2021, Covance was renamed Labcorp Drug Development. 
According to the website, Labcorp Drug Development develops drugs for a range of industries, offering services in the preclinical, clinical and post-market phases of drug development, the product life cycles for medical device and diagnostics and development services paired with regulatory support for the chemical testing and crop protection industries. Labcorp Drug Development claims to be a global leader in nonclinical safety assessment, clinical trial testing and clinical trial management services.

Labcorp Drug Development Services

The company's primary focus is serving the pharmaceutical and biotechnology industries. As part of its clinical and non-clinical development services, it provides drug development services across all phases of development and multiple therapeutic areas such as cardiovascular, diabetes, endocrinology and nephrology, immuno-oncology, infectious diseases, inflammation, neuroscience, non-alcoholic steatohepatitis (NASH), oncology, ophthalmology, rare diseases, pediatrics, and the development of companion diagnostics.

Labcorp Drug Development lists its services in the following categories:

Lead Optimization
Covance reports that it offers Lead Optimization Non-GLP Toxicology, In Vivo Pharmacology, Nonclinical Imaging, Nonclinical Pathology, PK/TK Analysis and Reporting, and Immunology Services.

Analysis Services
The company offers bioanalytical services in small molecule, biologics, translational biomarkers, and LC-MS.

Research
A division of the company, Covance Research Products, Inc. (CRP), based in Denver, Pennsylvania, offers antibody products and antibody-development services to the research community. CRP also deals in the import and sale of laboratory animals. According to its website, CRP breeds and sells dogs, rabbits, guinea pigs, non-human primates, and pigs. It has also bred and trademarked new breeds of animals including the "Mini-Mongrel" dog. The company also imports wild-caught primates. Labcorp Drug Developments's animal-testing programs and facilities are AAALAC-accredited, ISO 9001:2000-registered, OLAW-assured, and USDA-research registered. According to the company, CRP programs and facilities are overseen by attending staff veterinarians and AALAS-certified technicians.

Safety Assessment
Labcorp Drug Development says it offers General Toxicology Studies, Genetic Toxicology, Immunotoxicology, Nonclinical Pathology Services, Safety Pharmacology, Services, Developmental and Reproductive Toxicology, (DART) Studies, and SEND - Standard for the Exchange of Nonclinical Data.

Consulting & Partnering
Labcorp Drug Development partners with pharmaceutical companies and biotechnology companies in various consulting and partnership agreements by offering drug development program management services, alliance management, early phase development solutions, Labcorp Drug Development MarketPlace, drug development consulting, access and strategy, and evidence generation.

Clinical Development
Labcorp Drug Development supports companies with their clinical trials, which involves early clinical / Phase IIa, Phase IIb / III services, clinical data management analysis and reporting, regulatory services, and Phase IV solutions.

Clinical Testing
In the clinical testing space, Labcorp Drug Development says it offers services involving flow cytometry, a central laboratory, biomarker testing capabilities, companion diagnostics, genomics, vaccines, and immunotherapeutics.

Commercialization
In the drug development commercialization space, Labcorp Drug Development reports to offer a service called MarketPlace and also offers patient support, field services, drug safety and pharmacovigilance.

Manufacturing Support
On the manufacturing side, Labcorp Drug Development reports that it offers chemistry, manufacturing and control (CMC) services.

Informatics
In 2011, Labcorp Drug Development (then Covance) launched its Xcellerate platform as an informatics tool to help optimize clinical trial performance. In 2018, Xcellerate won industry recognition with the Scrip Award for Best Technological Development in Clinical Trials.

In 2016, Labcorp Drug Development entered a five-year strategic alliance with Global Specimen Solutions and the use of their specimen management product, GlobalCODE, among other software products. In 2017, Global Specimen Solutions, Inc. was listed as a Labcorp subsidiary.

Functional Service Provision (FSP)
Labcorp Drug Development reports to help with staffing biopharmaceutical companies in the roles of clinical operations and clinical analytics under the Functional Service Provider (FSP) model. The acquisition of Chiltern in 2017 (as Covance) helped Labcorp Drug Development grow its FSP capabilities.

Animal health and welfare
Labcorp Drug Development states its purpose for animal research helps support fundamental studies, toxicological and safety evaluation, production and quality control, efficacy testing and diagnosis in the drug development process. Labcorp Drug Development reports that it has an excellent record of complying with animal welfare regulations, including the European Council Directive 2010–63/EU, the U.S. Animal Welfare Act and the requirements set forth by the United States Department of Agriculture (USDA) and the U.S. Public Health Service Policy on the Humane Care and Use of Laboratory Animals.

Adherence to the 3Rs
Under the industry principles of the 3Rs, Labcorp Drug Development also uses alternative test methods beyond animal testing (in vivo), which includes in vitro testing, non-testing methods (in silico) and analytics.

Welfare standards
Labcorp Drug Development reports that it continues to improve animal welfare: “Three years before the European Commission issued its current regulations on animal habitats, we increased the size of the pens for primates living in our labs in Germany in order to provide them with a more comfortable setting.” Labcorp Drug Development also shares research on animal welfare topics, such as social housing of nonhuman primates.

Labcorp Drug Development employees have published a Code of Respect for humane care of animals used in scientific research.

Animal welfare issues

Ebola virus
In December 1989 a number of cynomolgus macaques (Macaca fascicularis) were imported from Mindanao Island in the Philippines with the Ebola virus to Covance's Hazleton Research Products' Primate Quarantine Unit in Reston, Virginia. The company was using monkeys there for research purposes, according to The Washington Post. The virus was confirmed in one monkey and suspected in others among a group of 100. In March 1996 two macaques that had been shipped to Hazleton in Alice, Texas, tested positive for the Ebola virus from a group of 100 obtained from the same supplier. The strains were not infectious to humans, and no human illnesses were reported.

Münster, Germany 
In 2003 the British Union for the Abolition of Vivisection (BUAV) sent a German investigative journalist, Friedrich Mülln, into the Covance facility in Münster, Germany's largest primate-testing center, where he filmed undercover for five months.

The footage was shown on German public television in December 2003. Nature reported that it showed animal keepers dancing with half-anaesthetized monkeys, making their heads move to the rhythm of the music. It also showed staff handling the monkeys roughly and shouting at them. The monkeys were seen living isolated in small wire cages with little or no natural light and no environmental enrichment, with high noise levels caused by staff shouting and playing the radio, and undergoing surgery with no post-operative care. In response, Covance maintained that clips showing different technicians working in different buildings had been edited together, resulting in a sequence of events that did not take place. The company also said there was group housing and pair housing for some monkeys, but the BUAV chose not to show that. Covance said they planned to upgrade the housing to comply with future European Union guidelines.

Jane Goodall, a primatologist, described the monkeys' living conditions as horrendous. Another primatologist, Stephen Brend, argued that using monkeys in such a stressed state was "bad science", and that trying to extrapolate useful data in such circumstances was an "untenable proposition." The environment minister for North Rhine-Westphalia asked the public prosecutor to investigate, and said that if the allegations were borne out, the company would lose its licence to keep primates. According to the European Biomedical Research Association, a lobby group, the authorities inspected Covance and insisted that the company install video cameras to monitor staff working with primates. Covance appealed through the courts, which ruled that video monitoring would infringe the rights of the staff. The public prosecutor's office viewed the film and questioned witnesses, and concluded that Covance "had not rendered themselves liable to prosecution" and that the state veterinary officer "had not failed in his supervisory duties."

Vienna, Virginia, United States
People for the Ethical Treatment of Animals (PETA) alleged similar conditions in Covance's Vienna, Virginia, lab when it sent an undercover investigator to obtain a job there as a technician from April 2004 to March 2005. Subsequent inspections by the United States Department of Agriculture (USDA) resulted in 16 citations in April 2006. The USDA declined to give details; according to Covance the violations ranged from "administrative issues to scope of veterinary authority." The company agreed to pay a settlement of $8,720.

In June 2005, Covance filed a lawsuit in the United States against PETA and the investigator for fraud, breach of employee contract, and "conspiracy to harm the company's business by deceitfully infiltrating and videotaping the ... facility." In exchange for not suing the infiltrator for illegally filming within Covance's lab, PETA US signed an agreement to hand over all video footage and written notes to Covance, and agreed to a ban on conducting any infiltration of Covance for five years.

The company filed a parallel lawsuit in England in an attempt to stop PETA showing the tape; the British judge called the footage "highly disturbing", and ruled that there was a legitimate public interest in the material being shown. Covance and PETA agreed to a settlement that resulted in no payment to Covance, and with PETA allowed to continue to publish the video.

New code
In response to the controversy, Covance issued a statement undertaking to observe a number of principles, including treating the animals in its care with respect, abiding by all applicable laws and regulations, employing alternatives where appropriate, minimizing animal discomfort and stress, training employees, and encouraging them to report any misconduct.

References

Further reading 
 Centers for Disease Control and Prevention. "Known Cases and Outbreaks of Ebola Hemorrhagic Fever, in Chronological Order", 12 October 2011.
 Covance. "2011 Annual report".
 Covance Laboratories Inc v. People for the Ethical Treatment of Animals, et al., Chancery No. 2005–2590 (Va. Cir. Ct., Fairfax City, June 3, 2005.
 Covance Laboratories Ltd, et al. v. Covance Campaign, et al., Claim Nom 5C-00295, High Court of Justice, Chancery Division, June 16, 2005.
 Mirowski, Philip and Van Horn, Robert. "The Contract Research Organization and the Commercialization of Scientific Research", Social Studies of Science, Vol. 35, No. 4 (August 2005), pp. 503–548.

Companies formerly listed on the New York Stock Exchange
Animal testing in the United States
Companies based in Princeton, New Jersey
American companies established in 1997
Contract research organizations
Pharmaceutical companies based in New Jersey
Corning Inc.
2014 mergers and acquisitions
1997 establishments in New Jersey
Biotechnology companies established in 1997
Pharmaceutical companies established in 1997